Blanco State Park is a  park, along a mile of the Blanco River, on the southern edge of Blanco, Texas.  It features camping, picnicking, screened shelters, swimming, tubing, nature trails, and a wildlife viewing station.  The park is hilly with mostly cedar, and pecan trees. Among the animals seen at the park are nutria, mallards, raccoon, armadillo and squirrel.

Much of the early development of the park was done by the Civilian Conservation Corps in the 1930s, including a group picnic pavilion.

On May 24, 2015 the park was hit by a catastrophic flood.

See also

 List of Texas state parks

References

Links 

 Film segment about Blanco State Park in Vacation Trails: Hill Country and the Highland Lakes (1943) on the Texas Archive of the Moving Image

State parks of Texas
Protected areas of Blanco County, Texas
Civilian Conservation Corps in Texas